Mary Mannering  (born Florence Friend; April 29, 1876 – January 21, 1953) was an English actress. She studied for the stage under Hermann Vezin. She made her debut at Manchester in 1892 under her own name of Florence Friend.

Biography
Born Clara Friend, she was the daughter of Richard Friend and Eliza Whiting. Her family moved to follow her father's job in the building trade. During her teens she began to perform on the stage (She adopted the name Florence for this purpose).. She worked as a dressmaker during these years, until at least 1891. In her early 20s she was induced by a producer Daniel Frohman to come to New York in 1896.  In the United States, she began playing as "Mary Mannering" (the maiden name of her father's mother).

Mannering's American debut, in the title role in Henry V. Esmond's The Courtship of Leonie, was at Daniel Frohman's original Lyceum Theatre on December 1, 1896. Other plays with the Lyceum company included Sydney Grundy's The Late Mr. Castello on December 14, 1896, Frances Hodgson Burnett and George Fleming's The First Gentleman of Europe, Louis N. Parker's The Mayflower, and Arthur Wing Pinero's The Princess and the Butterfly (all 1897), The Tree of Knowledge by R.C. Carton, Trelawny of the 'Wells' by Pinero (both 1898), Americans at Home by Grace Livingstone Furniss (1899), and John Ingerfield by Jerome K. Jerome (1900). In 1900 Mannering starred at Buffalo, N. Y. and then in the Broadway debut of Janice Meredith, in the title role opposite Robert Drouet who played Colonel Jack Brereton in the four-act play based on a novel of the same name by Paul Leicester Ford.  Thereafter, she played leading parts in White Roses (New York, 1901); The Truants (Washington, 1909); The Independent Miss Gower (Chicago, 1909); A Man's World and The Garden of Allah (New York, 1911).

Personal life
She married James K. Hackett, the Lyceum company's leading actor, on May 2, 1897, though the marriage was not announced until January 1898. They had a daughter, Elise, in 1904. She later married Frederick E. Wadsworth. She died, a widow, on January 21, 1953, at Los Angeles.

References

Publications
Blum, Daniel C., Great Stars of the American Stage #Profile 9, c.1952(second printing 1954)
Brown, Thomas Allston, A History of the New York Stage from the First Performance in 1732 to 1901, Volume III, New York: Dodd, Mead & Company, 1903.
Moses, Montrose J., "Famous Families of American Players: No. 3 - The Hacketts", The Theatre Magazine, v.V n.47, January 1905, pp. 13–16.
William Winter, The Wallet of Time, (two volumes, New York, 1913)

External links

Mary Mannering photo section at NYP Library
Mary Mannering portraits ; University of Washington, Sayre collection
 PeriodPaper; Mary Mannering

1876 births
1953 deaths
Actresses from London
British expatriate actresses in the United States
British stage actresses
English stage actresses
19th-century British actresses
19th-century English people
19th-century English women